Hijack is a 2008 Indian action thriller film starring Shiney Ahuja and Esha Deol. The film is written and directed by Kunal Shivdasani and is based on the hijacking of Indian Airlines Flight 814. The film premiered on 5 September 2008.

Plot
Vikram Madan (Shiney Ahuja) is a ground maintenance engineer at the Chandigarh Airport. His social life is limited to one friend, Rajeev, the security chief of the same airport. Vikram's daughter  Priya (Ishitha Chauhan) is traveling with her teacher for a debate contest to Amritsar from Delhi. That flight gets hijacked by a group of six terrorists working for a man named Rasheed (KK Raina) who has been captured by the Indian police. The flight is forced to land at the Chandigarh Airport. These terrorists demand the release of Rasheed from the Indian Government or they threaten to kill the hostages inside the aircraft. Now Vikram is faced with a dilemma of being the only man who can sneak inside the aircraft and try to save the life of his daughter Priya. Once he breaches into the aircraft with the help of air hostess Saira (Esha Deol), he starts plotting and planning and killing the terrorists one by one. Some innocent passengers become the victims of the terrorists and die. However somehow Vikram and Saira together save the day.

Cast
 Shiney Ahuja as Vikram Madan
 Esha Deol as Saira
 KK Raina as Rasheed
 Ishitha Chauhan as Priya Madan
 Kush Sharma 
 Mona Ambegaonkar as Simone
 Kaveri Jha as Pooja Madan
 Rasika Dugal as Neha 
 Ujjwal Chopra

Music
The soundtrack was scored by debutante duo Justin-Uday.
 Yaad Mein Aksar - KK
 Dekh Dekh - Sunidhi Chauhan, Suraj Jagan, Rap by Joi
 Koi Na Jaane - KK, Shilpa Rao
 Theme Of Hijack - Suraj Jagan, Uday
 Aksar (Unplugged) - Shaan
 Dekh Dekh (Club Mix) - Sunidhi Chauhan, Joi
 Yaad Mein Aksar (Remix) - KK, Joi
 Yaad Mein Aksar (Sad) - Shaan

References

External links
 
 

2008 films
2008 thriller drama films
Indian thriller drama films
Films about aircraft hijackings
Thriller films based on actual events
Indian films based on actual events
Films about terrorism in India
Films set on airplanes
Indian aviation films
2000s Hindi-language films
2008 drama films
2000 millennium attack plots
Films about jihadism